Sir James Spearman Winter,  (1 January 1845 – 6 October 1911) was a Newfoundland politician and Premier.

Life
Winter served in the Conservative government of Sir William Whiteway as Solicitor-General from 1882 to 1885 when he resigned along with a number of other Protestants as a result of sectarian riots at Harbour Grace. Winter was grand master of the Orange Order and intended to launch a new Protestant party but was sidelined when Sir Robert Thorburn formed the Reform Party on a Protestant Rights agenda. Winter served as Attorney General under Thorburn from 1885 to 1889 when the government was defeated and Winter lost his seat. Winter was appointed to the Supreme Court in 1893 but resigned to lead the Tory Party (which had emerged from the former Reform Party). Winter and his party won the 1897 election.

The Winter government faced criticism over the granting of railway contracts and was accused by the Liberal opposition of selling out Newfoundland's interest to the Reid family as the minister of finance in Winter's government was also on Reid's payroll as his legal council while the contract was being negotiated. The scandal was a factor in the defeat of Winter's government in 1900.

As a jurist, Winter represented Newfoundland at the 1887-1888 fisheries conference in Washington and was senior counsel for the British government when Newfoundland was before the arbitration tribunal at the Hague in 1910 over a fisheries dispute.

The town of Winterton was named after him.

His sons James and Harry both went on to serve as speakers for the Newfoundland assembly.

External links 
 

1845 births
1911 deaths
Canadian Knights Commander of the Order of St Michael and St George
Premiers of Newfoundland Colony
Speakers of the Newfoundland and Labrador House of Assembly
People from Lamaline
Newfoundland Colony judges
Attorneys-General of Newfoundland Colony